Tujerdi (also Romanized as Tūjerdī; also known as Tūcherdī) is a village in Tujerdi Rural District, Sarchehan District, Bavanat County, Fars Province, Iran. At the 2006 census, its population was 1,515, in 387 families.

References 

Populated places in Sarchehan County